Loxley House is the administrative office of Nottingham City Council and an office base for the Department of Work and Pensions and Nottingham City Homes in the south of Nottingham city centre. It is situated opposite Nottingham railway station on Station Street.

The Council acquired the building from Capital One in 2009 at a cost of £22.5 million and began moving staff there shortly afterwards.

References

Government buildings in England
Buildings and structures in Nottingham